Butte Sink is a depression  in the Sacramento Valley, and within Butte County, California.

It is the location of the Butte Sink Wildlife Management Area and Butte Sink National Wildlife Refuge.

References

Landforms of Butte County, California
Geological depressions in the United States
Geography of the Sacramento Valley
Wetlands of California